Spring is the third in a comprehensive four-EP collection released by Jon Foreman, the singer/songwriter of the San Diego rock band Switchfoot. It was released as a digital download on Tuesday, March 25, 2008, peaking at No. 14 on Billboards Top Digital Albums chart and No. 179 on the Comprehensive Album Chart.

Sound
Spring carries a new sound from the previous two Foreman EPs, Fall and Winter, which were more melancholy in nature. "Spring" is rooted in more upbeat, hopeful tones. "March", an upbeat and jumpy song, sets the tone for the rest of the EP, which captures and corresponds with the "rebirth" and "new life" themes that are commonly associated with the season.

Track listing

Notes
 A different version of "Revenge" originally was considered for inclusion in Switchfoot's sixth studio album, Oh! Gravity., and appeared as a bonus track on some versions of that album.

Personnel
 Jon Foreman – lead vocals, guitar
 Molly Jenson – background vocals on "March"
 Sarah Masen – background vocal on "Love Isn't Made"
 Emily Foreman –  "Love Isn't Made" on "Love Isn't Made"
 Karl Denson – flute on "Baptize My Mind"
 Keith Tutt II – cello (all tracks)

References

2008 EPs
Jon Foreman albums